Lefevrea longelytrata is a species of leaf beetle. It is distributed in the Democratic Republic of the Congo and Sudan. It was first described by the Belgian entomologist  in 1940.

References 

Eumolpinae
Beetles of the Democratic Republic of the Congo
Insects of Sudan
Beetles described in 1940